Plaza Beach Resort Bonaire is the largest diving resort in the southern Caribbean Island of Bonaire, located at 80 Julio A. Abraham Boulevard, south of Kralendijk, just north of Flamingo International Airport (about  away). It is operated by the Van der Valk family of hoteliers and is also known as the Plaza Resort Van der Valk. American divers have reportedly voted it one of the top 10 dive resorts in the world. The resort, which claims to be five-star, although this is disputed by several independent publications, is situated on a peninsula, at the mouth of a man-made lagoon with turquoise blue waters.

Size
In 2002, the hotel contained 174 rooms and apartments, 198 rooms were reported in 2006 and 200 rooms were reported in 2007. As of 2006, it was reported to contain nine two-storey buildings. In 2017 Plaza Beach Resort Bonaire has 126 rooms. They have junior and grand suites. The grand suites are completely renovated. Plaza Beach Resort Bonaire has the biggest hotel rooms of Bonaire. The hotel also contains a large freshwater swimming pool, a casino, a fitness centre and a water sports facility & three different conference rooms. A turquoise lagoon meanders its way through the resort. The main restaurant of the hotel is known as Tipsy Seagull this is a buffet restaurant with different theme nights every day of the week. ; For ordering drinks and small snacks you can go to the beach bar, known as Coconut Crash.

Life at Bonair Plaza enlivens after sunset. Diving and snorkelling are the activities that are seen using four-cell flash lights, since the use of chemical lamps is banned in this Marine park.

Marine species
  
Deep water corals seen, at depths below wave action in the lagoon, grow in the limited light that penetrates into the sea. The species variety has been conjectured as Agaricia lamarcki and Agaricia grahamae. These are seen in the form of thin plates stacked one above the other but are fragile.

Toucan Divers of the resort arrange a special diving near the Town Pier, which is a shallow dive site with colourful and varied  marine life. The nightlife witnessed, of the underwater sea, is full of coral formations and marine creatures. Tarpons, the large silvery fish gets its feed as, when the flash lights used by divers attract the smaller fish species which come out and become easy prey.

Seaquarium

The  seaquarium built into the lagoon is the hub of training activities of the Dive and Sports Center of the resort. Boats are operated from the marina attached to the resort; the marina is planned in such a way that it does not disturb the marine environment near the lagoon.

See also
Divi Flamingo Beach Resort & Casino

Gallery

References

External links
Official site

Hotels in Bonaire
Underwater diving resorts
Hotel buildings completed in 1995
Hotels established in 1995